James Edward Clark (April 30, 1947 – January 14, 2019) was a Major League Baseball outfielder who played for one season. He played for the Cleveland Indians from July 16, 1971, to August 3, 1971.

References

External links

1947 births
2019 deaths
Cleveland Indians players
Major League Baseball outfielders
Baseball players from Kansas
Sportspeople from Kansas City, Kansas
Burlington Bees players
Wytheville Senators players
Leesburg A's players
Peninsula Grays players
High Point-Thomasville Hi-Toms players
Birmingham A's players
Wichita Aeros players
Portland Beavers players
Omaha Royals players
Los Angeles High School alumni